The 2021–22 season is Chiangrai United's 11th consecutive season in Thai League 1, following promotion in 2010.

In addition to the domestic league, the club will also compete in this season's editions of the Thai FA Cup and the AFC Champions League.

Squad

Transfer

Pre-season transfer

In

Out

Loan Out

Mid-season transfer

In

Out

Loan Out

Return from loan

Extension

Friendlies

Pre-Season Friendly

Mid-Season Friendly

Competitions

Overview

Champions Cup

Thai League 1

League table

Results summary

Results by matchday

Matches

Thai FA Cup

Matches

League Cup

Matches

2021 AFC Champions League

Group stage

2022 AFC Champions League

Group stage

Team statistics

Appearances and goals

Notes

References 

2021 in Thai football leagues
2021-22
Chiangrai United F.C.